During the 2018 election year in Virginia several local, state, and federal elections were held. On May 1, several of Virginia's cities and towns held mayoral, city council, and school board elections. Primary elections for Congress were held on June 12.

The general election  was on November 6, 2018, for all 11 of Virginia's House of Representative seats, as well as the Class 1 Senate seat. 2018 Virginia's 8th House of Delegates district special election will also be held that day. The seat, being vacated by Greg Habeeb, is being sought by Republican Roanoke County Supervisor Joe McNamara and Radford University associate director Democrat Carter Turner.

Special elections were held January 16 for Chilhowie town council, on February 6 for Leesburg town council, and on July 24 for Isle of Wight County sheriff.

Federal elections

United States Senate

On November 6, Virginians re-elected their Class 1 senator Tim Kaine, who will serve from 2019 until 2025. He was challenged by Republican Corey Stewart and Libertarian Matt Waters. The Commonwealth's Green and Constitution parties did not run candidates.

House of Representatives 

Virginians elected their representatives who served from 2019 until 2021. Nine of the 11 incumbent Representatives ran for re-election. The Republican Party were defending seven seats, five of which were incumbents, and the Democratic Party were defending four seats, all of whom were incumbents. Ten of the 11 districts featured at least two candidates running, while three districts had third party candidates running.

By district
Results of the 2018 United States House of Representatives elections in Virginia by district:

Ballot measures 

There were two state constitutional amendments on the ballot. Both proposed ballot amendments received nearly universal, bipartisan support in the Virginia House of Delegates and Senate.

Amendment 1 reads: "Should a county, city, or town be authorized to provide a partial tax exemption for real property that is subject to recurrent flooding, if flooding resiliency improvements have been made on the property?"

Amendment 2 reads: "Shall the real property tax exemption for a primary residence that is currently provided to the surviving spouses of veterans who had a one hundred percent service-connected, permanent, and total disability be amended to allow the surviving spouse to move to a different primary residence and still claim the exemption?"

Municipal elections

Board of Supervisors elections

City mayoral elections 

The following towns in Virginia held mayoral elections. Most mayoral elections were held on May 1, 2018. City elections in Virginia are officially nonpartisan, parties are only shown if their affiliated party is known.

|-
|}

Town mayoral elections 

The following towns in Virginia held mayoral elections. Most mayoral elections were held on May 1, 2018. Town elections in Virginia are officially nonpartisan, parties are only shown if their affiliated party is known.

|-
|}

References

External links 
 2018 Virginia Dept of Elections results 
 Candidates at Ballotpedia

 
Virginia